In enzymology, a phosphoamidase is an enzyme that catalyzes the chemical reaction

N-phosphocreatine + H2O  creatine + phosphate

Thus, the two substrates of this enzyme are N-phosphocreatine and H2O, whereas its two products are creatine and phosphate.

This enzyme belongs to the family of hydrolases, specifically those acting on phosphorus-nitrogen bonds.  The systematic name of this enzyme class is phosphamide hydrolase. This enzyme is also called creatine phosphatase.

References

 
 
 

EC 3.9.1
Enzymes of unknown structure